The 1922 Memorial Cup final was the fourth junior ice hockey championship of the Canadian Amateur Hockey Association. The Eastern Canada champions were scheduled to play the Western Canada champions for the Memorial Cup in a two-game, total goal series, to be held at Shea's Amphitheatre in Winnipeg, Manitoba, The Canadian Amateur Hockey Association decided to save money, to have the George Richardson Memorial Trophy winners Toronto Aura Lee play the Fort William War Veterans en route to Winnipeg, rather than have Fort William play the Abbott Cup champions Regina Pats of the South Saskatchewan Junior Hockey League. Fort William defeated Aura Lee 5–3 in the sudden death playoff game. Fort William later won their 1st Memorial Cup, defeating Regina 8 goals to 7.

Scores
Game 1: Fort William 5-4 Regina
Game 2: Regina 3-3 Fort William

Winning roster
Walter Adams, Johnny Bates, Jerry Bourke, Ted D'Arcy, Chic Enwright, Alex Phillips, Fred Thornes, Clark Whyte. Coach: Stan Bliss

References

External links
 Memorial Cup
 Canadian Hockey League

Mem
Memorial Cup tournaments
Ice hockey in Winnipeg